Jorge Elias Ponce is a former Honduran middle distance runner. Ponce is known for holding the Honduran records in the 800m, 1500m, and 5000m. He competed in the 1500m at the World Championships.

See also
 List of Honduran records in athletics

References

Year of birth missing (living people)
Living people
Honduran male middle-distance runners